Egypt is an unincorporated community located in Jackson County, Kentucky, United States. Their post office  has been closed.

A post office was established in the community in 1876, and was given the name Egypt by the newly transplanted Amyx family who felt homesick in the rural backwater, as if they had been exiled to Egypt.

References

Unincorporated communities in Jackson County, Kentucky
Unincorporated communities in Kentucky